Tab Townsell is the executive director of Metroplan.

Personal life and education
Townsell graduated from Conway High School in 1979. He graduated from the University of Central Arkansas in 1984, with a major in political science and a minor in economics. Townsell earned an MBA from Texas Christian University in 1986.

Career
Townsell worked as an intern for Senator Dale Bumpers, and served on Conway's Transportation Advisory Committee and the Conway Planning Commission prior to becoming mayor. Townsell worked in construction, first for Townsell-Hill Construction and then as a co-owner of Concrete Forming. Townsell was re-elected in 2012 to a fifth term, but has announced that he won't seek a sixth term. Alongside Conway business leaders, Townsell helped legalize liquor sales in Conway and pushed through a city re-development plan.

In August 2016, he was selected by the Metroplan board of directors as the agency's next executive director.

References

External links
Twitter account

Living people
People from Conway, Arkansas
University of Central Arkansas alumni
Texas Christian University alumni
Mayors of places in Arkansas
Arkansas Democrats
Year of birth missing (living people)